Philippe Falliex (Born April 27, 1966, in Lyon, France) is a French composer specializing in background music for television and radio programs.

Stereolithe: 2001-present
Since 2001, Philippe Falliex has dedicated himself to composing music for televised and radio programs. He created Stereolithe, a company through which his work is contracted. Stereolithe has been responsible for the theme and background music for some of the most prominent shows on French television and radio.

Television shows for which he composed music
Sans Auncun Doute (More than 400 episodes)
Le grand Frère, Confession Intime
Les soirées Anti-Arnaque
Le grand Quizz
La soirée du Sommeil
Une nuit à Marrakech
Au cœur de L’armée de Terre
En vol avec l’armée de l’air
Les Voisins
Les Sept Péchés Capitaux
Otto
Les imitateurs
Ca peut vous arriver
Le champion du rire
Le champion de la télé
La Maison du Bluff
Zone Paranormale

Radio shows for which he composed music
La bonne touche, hosted by Jean-Pierre Foucault et Cyril Hanouna
L’heure du crime, hosted by Jacques Pradel
Tout le plaisir est pour nous, hosted by Flavie Flament
Le grand quiz des histoires de France, hosted by Laurent Boyer
On refait la semaine
La tête dans les étoiles

Early years (1984-2000)
Philippe Falliex started his career as a professional drummer, playing for many different artists on several international tours and studio sessions. Within these years he also composed several songs for his sister, composing the album Caméléon almost in its entirety

Songs he composed
Caméléon
Dame Brune
Être vrai
Fantôme de l’amour
La valse des anges
Le silence à des ailes
Les petites cicatrices
N’importe où fera l’affaire
Tant pis si j’ai mal
Toutes les histoires
Aime- moi
C’est bon d’aimer
C’est la vie
Ces petits riens
Entre nous
De l’autre côté du temps

Note: All songs interpreted by Liane Foly

Other endeavours
Since 2000 Philippe Falliex holds the patent in Europe Canada, the US, and Japan for a revolutionary drum pedal which allows for infinite new rhythms to be explored (United States Patent 6087573) 

He was also the artistic director and musical arranger for the following productions

Catalogue de My Edition Company (composer, producer, more than 400 tracks)

DVD Liane Foly / La Folle Parenthese (artistic director/executive producer)
La Star Acadmie (sound director from 2006 to 2008)
Cameleon by Liane Foly
Entre Nous by Liane Foly
Hymne du stade de France (arrangement, composer)
Album Elonakane (released by Universal in 2010 / co-production Stephane Courbis, artistic director/executive producer)
Émission Interne HSBC (artistic director / executive producer)
Stephane Sage (artistic director / executive producer)
Aila Onda (artistic director / executive producer)
Orchestre National du Maroc (PBO)
Pepito (musical director)
Dodge (executive producer)
Gerald Dahan
Laâm (PBO)
Natascha St Pierre (PBO)
Gerald Dahan (PBO)
Michel Villano (PBO)
Michael Gregorio (PBO)
Dany Mauro (PBO)

Musical Education
Musician's Institute of Los Angeles, California
Drummers' Collective of New York City, New York

Awards
Médaille de la SACEM en 2007
Membre Permanent de la SACEM
Disque de platine pour le disque "Entre Nous..." de Liane Foly
Double Disque d'or pour l'album “Acoustique” de Liane Foly
Double Disque d'or pour l'album “Caméléon” de Liane Foly
Gold Certificatione for the album “Lumière” de Liane Foly

Personal life
Falliex was born in France to Algerian parents, and is the brother of French pop singer Liane Foly.

References

External links 
Philippe Falliex
Stereolithe
My Edition Company
Zikinstock

French male composers
1966 births
Living people
Musicians from Lyon
French people of Algerian descent